The Socialist Party of Moldova is a socialist political party in Moldova. It came second in the 1994 parliamentary election in alliance with the Unity Movement for Equality in Rights, the successor of the Pan-Soviet anti-independence movement in Moldova and supported by the then-unregistered Party of Communists of the Republic of Moldova.

In 1997 a faction split from the party and founded the Party of Socialists of the Republic of Moldova (PSRM), which would later become a major party in Moldovan politics.

At the 2005 parliamentary election on March 6, the party formed the Electoral Bloc Motherland together with PSRM, but won no seats. It hasn't participated to any other election since then.

References

1992 establishments in Moldova
Political parties established in 1992
Socialist parties in Moldova